Tishomingo Blues is a 2002 novel by Elmore Leonard, set in Mississippi, about two fledgling allies, the local Dixie Mafia, and a high-stakes Civil War re-enactment.

Leonard says that Tishomingo Blues is, of the books he has written, his favorite.

FilmFour planned to make a movie adaptation of the novel, with actor Don Cheadle directing (and possibly starring), but in 2007 Cheadle described the project as "dead".

The title comes from the famous Spencer Williams song "Tishomingo Blues" (1917).

References

Novels by Elmore Leonard
2002 American novels
Novels set in Mississippi
William Morrow and Company books
Books with cover art by Chip Kidd